Canovee is the name of a rural region and a village nucleus in the Lee valley in County Cork, Ireland. The toponym 'Canovee' is synonymous with the official version Cannaway (as in the civil parish of Cannaway), and the electoral division of Cannaway.

Geography 

"Island" of Canavoy

Canovee has sometimes been referred to as an 'island', because most of the parish's boundaries are formed by bodies of water. For example, the River Lee constituting its north-eastern, northern and north-western borders, the Kame River and one of its tributaries lie to the east, and the Aghthying Stream is to the west.

Civil parish of Cannaway

The civil parish of Cannaway corresponds to the 'Island of Canavoy'. Civil parishes were ecclesiastical units of territory based on Gaelic tuatha, or early Christian and monastic settlements from the 12th century. They were later adopted by the Church of Ireland, and subsequently became civil administrative areas.

The official names of the constituent townlands of the civil parish of Cannaway, as per the Placenames (County Cork) Order 2012 include:

 Bawnatemple- Bán an Teampaill
 Classes- Na Clasa Fada
 Cooldrum- Cúldrom
 Coolnacarriga- Cúil na Carraige
 Coolnashamroge- Cúil na Seamróg
 Coolnasoon Cúil na Suan
 Killinardrish Cill an Ard-dorais
 Knockavullig- Cnoc an Mhullaigh
 Lehenagh- Leitheanach
 Loughleigh; An Loch Liath
 Mahallagh- Maigh Shalach
 Monallig- Maigh nDealg
 Nettleville Demesne- Nettleville
 Rathonoane- Ráth Ó nDúbháin
 Shandangan East- An Seandaingean Thoir
 Shandangan West- An Seandaingean Thiar

Mahallagh is translated as Maigh Shalach, even though it is mentioned in Mac Carthaigh's Book in the year 1262 as Magh Oiligh ('Oiligh' being the genitive of 'Oileach', a word for stony, or a stone building- and 'Oileach' as spoken in Munster Irish matching local pronunciation of the name as closely as 'Shalach').

Electoral division of Cannaway

The electoral division of Cannaway, number 18201, includes the 16 townlands of the civil parish of Cannaway, as well as Rooves Beg (An Rú Beag), which is a constituent townland of the neighbouring civil parish of Aglish.

Demographics 
As per the CSO, the population of the Cannaway Electoral Division (21.6km2) in 2011 was 595, with 293 males and 302 females. There was an increase of 13.8% since 2006.

History

13th and 14th centuries 

Mac Carthaigh's Book

Mac Carthaigh's Book (published in the 17th century) records that in 1262[sic], the Norman De Cogan castle of Magh Oiligh (Mahallagh) was destroyed by Fínghin Reanna Róin Mac Carthaigh, King of Desmond, and the people of Desmond. Finghín's forces defeated the Norman FitzGeralds of Munster at the Battle of Callan in 1261, curtailing Geraldine influence in Desmond.

Annals Of Innisfallen

The Annals of Inisfallen record that, in 1317, "warfare breaks out between some of the Cogans and the Barrys, and the lands of Dáuíd de Cócán from Loch Mu-Choba to Bern na hEile are laid waste and burned by the Barrys and some of the Roches. After Candlemas a further prey is taken by them against the same Cogans; and in the course of this raid J[ohn ?], son of Godfrey, is despoiled, his court being burned, and the castle of Mag Oilig (Mahallagh) is destroyed" (once again).

17th century  

Civil Survey Of The Barony Of Muskerry (1656)
The Civil Survey was a cadastral survey of landholdings in Ireland by the Cromwellian administration, showing proprietors and property as they stood at the outbreak of the Irish Rebellion of 1641. It was organised by parish, barony and county and identified proprietors by religion, in preparation for redistribution of forfeited estates to establish a new social and political order in Ireland.

Canavoy Parish, consisting of 'ten Plowlands and an half' is said to be "mear'd & bounded on the East with the Parish of Aglish, and distinguish'd from it by a small Brook running into the River Lee, on the South with the Parish of Moviddy, on West with the Parish of Kilmurry, and on the North West, & North with the River Lee, the said Parish is in Length from Carrigadrohid on the North, to the little ford call'd Ahanaboy on the South two Miles & in Breadth from the Lands of Rooves on the East, to the Lands of Ballytrasny in the West one Mile & half.
For the Generality of the Soyl it's Cold and Indifferent good for tillage, if Manur'd with Lyme or sea sand, which lyeth remote from it. Here are some Timber Wood & Coppices...

Here is the Parochial Church of the said Parish, standing about the bottom of the said Island of Canavoy near the River Lee. Nothing remains thereof but ye Walls, And on the North side near the same standeth the Walls of a large Ancient House, Which belongeth to the Chief Proprietor of the  said Island, being the Famely of the Longs."

 Modern-day Lehenagh: The proprietor of Lehanah/ Lehanagh- which was by estimation one plowland or 214 acres- was one John Long of Mount Long, Irish Papist (deceased). There was an old house on the premises. Lehanah was valued at £24.
 Modern-day Cooldrum, Coolnacarriga, Classis & Coolnasoon: John Long/ O Long was also the proprietor of Cooldram, Coolenacarrigy/ Coolenicarrigy, Clasfaddy and Coolnasoon/ Coorenasoone/ Coornasoon- approximately two plowlands, or 472 acres. On the premises were about three small thatched houses. These townlands were valued at £53.
 Modern-day Monallig & Killinardrish: John Long was cited as the proprietor of Mannollig, Inishmore and Killanardorish/ Killanardoris- approximately one and a half plowlands, or 327 acres. A Grist Mill, worth £5 sterling and 'some small Cabbins' near Carrigadrohid not Valuable'. These townlands were valued at £60.
 Modern-day Mahallagh, Loughleigh & Nettleville Demesne: Mahallagh/ Mahallogh/ Mohallagh/ Mahollagh- two plowlands, or 441 acres approximately- belonged to the Lord Of Muskery, Irish Papist. There was a thatched house and garden valued at £5 and 'some Cabbins not Valuable'. There was Timber wood fit for all uses valued at £100 in Mahallagh, and the townland itself was valued at £50.
 Modern-day Rathonoane & Knockavullig: Rathonoane/ Rathonuane and Knockavollig belonged to the Lord of Muskery, Irish Papist, had a 'decay'd Thatch'd house & some Cabbins not Valuable'. Estimated as one and a half plowlands, or 497 acres, and valued at £50.
 Modern-day Coolnashamroge: Coolenashamroge/ Coolnashamroge, half a plowland or approximately 100 acres, belonged to Pierce Gould of Corke, deceased merchant and Irish Papist. Valued at £12.
 Modern-day Shandangan: Shandangen/ Shandangan belonged to Derm'd McTeige Carthy of Inshyrahill (Inchirahilly), deceased Irish Papist. Estimated to be two plowlands or approximately 617 acres. Valued at £48. There was an old ruinous thatched house, not valuable on the premises.
 Church Land- the 'Gleab of this Parish', was described as being surrounded on all sides with the land of Coolnacarrigy, being approximately 6 acres in size and being worth three and four pence.
 In Rooves (Rooves More and Rooves Beg- a constituent of the modern Electoral Division of Cannaway) were a grist mill, valued at £4 sterling, and a tucking mill, valued at £2 sterling.

To the north in the neighbouring village of Carrigadrohid, the castle 'Situated on a rock in the midst of the River Lee' was valued at £100, the bridge across the Lee was made of timber and although out of repair, was passable on foot. There were six small houses and Cabbins and gardens- not valuable.

18th century  

Compleat Irish Traveller- 'Irish Traveller' (1788)

"At Mahallagh, five miles east from Macroomp, is a pleasant seat on the south bank of the Lee. Four miles east by south from Macroomp, in the parish of Canaboy, is a pleasant seat, graced with an handsome house, good gardens, large orchards, fish ponds, and a great number of trees planted. In the same parish is Shandangan, a mile south- west of the former, another pretty seat; the gardens lie to the west of the house, and are formed out of a drained bog, which is now cut into pleasant ponds; here are good orchards, and a deer park."

19th century  

Topographical Dictionary Of Ireland (1810) N. Carlisle 

Connoway, or Canaboy, in the Barony of Muskerry, Co. Cork is mentioned. It is described as having neither church, nor Glebe House. In 1806, the vicar was one James Bentley Gordon, who resided in the Diocese of Ferns and 'occasional duties' were performed by a curate residing in an adjoining parish 'at a salary of 10'.

Topographical Dictionary of Great Britain and Ireland (1833) John Gorton

The parish of Cannaway, or Canaboy, in the barony of Muskerry upon the River Lee in Co. Cork was named as one of the five Established Church parishes that constituted the Union of Killaspugmullane. The population was 1470 and the parish had an annual value of £230.

Longs

In M.C. O'Laughlin's Families Of County Cork, Ireland, the Longs are mentioned as having been erenaghs for Cannaway, or Canovee. The author goes on to mention that in the Civil Survey of the 1650s, the Longs are given as proprietors of Cannaway Island, and the remains of a large house of theirs was found on the north side of the River Lee.

Further reading 
 History of The City of Dublin, From The Earliest Accounts To The Present Time (1813) J. Warburton et al. (In Appendix III (xxvii), amongst the parishes in Muskerry with "perfect [Down Survey] maps; not damaged by fire, &c" is Kanaboy)
 The County And City Of Cork Remembrancer; or, Annals Of The County And City Of Cork (1837) Francis. H. Tuckey. (on page 63, there is mention of an inquisition in Cork on 4 November 1584, which- amongst other things- found that 'on the death of Matthew Sheyn, bishop of Ross, that see had three plowlands of Ballynaspick, the rent of Rochefort's land, the rent of Currickanaway of Ringaskiddy, Downaghmore, Aghabulloge and Canaboy).

References

Geography of County Cork
Towns and villages in County Cork